Villegreen is an unincorporated community located in Las Animas County, Colorado, United States. Villegreen is approximately 66 driving miles east of the county seat of Trinidad, Colorado, and almost an equal distance west of Springfield, Colorado, the seat of neighboring Baca County. The U.S. Post Office at Kim (ZIP Code 81049) now serves Villegreen postal addresses.

Geography 
Villegreen is located at  (37.305601,-103.519878).

References 

Unincorporated communities in Las Animas County, Colorado
Unincorporated communities in Colorado